The 2015 MFF  Charity Cup is the 4th MFF Charity Cup, an annual Myanmar football match played between the winners of the previous season's Myanmar National League and 2014 MFF Cup. The match was contested by Ayeyawady United, the 2014 MFF Cup winners, and Yadanarbon F.C., champions of the 2014 Myanmar National League. It was held at Aung San Stadium on 3 January 2015.

This was Yadanarbon F.C.'s 1st Cup appearance and Ayeyawady United's 2nd.

Background and pre-match

Yadanarbon F.C. qualified for the 2016 MFF Charity Cup as winners of the 2014 Myanmar National League. It was the club's third league title in 5 years. The other Charity Cup place went to Ayeyawady United, who defeated Nay Pyi Taw F.C. by two goals to win the 2014 MFF Cup and retain the trophy.
Yadanarbon F.C. made their first appearance in the Charity Cup. By contrast, Ayeyawady United made their third Chairity Cup appearance, and won once.  Both clubs had never met before in this Cup.

Match

Team selection

Details

Statistics

References

MFF Charity Cup
2015 in Burmese football